The Fang is a distinctive toothlike peak,  high, which forms the highest point of Fang Ridge on Mount Erebus, Ross Island. It was descriptively named by Frank Debenham of the British Antarctic Expedition, 1910–13, who made a plane table survey of the vicinity in 1912.

References 

Mountains of Ross Island